Thomas Schultz Rasmussen (born 16 April 1977) is a Danish former professional footballer who played as a left wingback. He played eight games for the Denmark national team, both as wingback and attacking midfielder.

Career
Born in Frederiksberg in Copenhagen, Rasmussen started his career in minor Danish club Glostrup IF 32. He debuted on the Danish under-19 national team in July 1996, and moved abroad to play for K. Sint-Truidense V.V. in Belgium. He returned to Denmark to play for an amateur club in Birkerød. When he got married in 1998, Rasmussen took his wife's last name, naming himself Thomas Schultz. 

In 2000, Schultz made his debut for Farum B.K. in the Danish 1st Division. He helped Farum win promotion for the top-flight Danish Superliga in 2002. During the 2002–03 Danish Superliga season, Schultz played 31 of 33 league games, scoring five league goals. He made his debut for the Danish national team in April 2003. In the summer 2003, Schultz moved to Germany, to play for Hansa Rostock in the top-flight Bundesliga. At Rostock, he joined fellow Dane Kim Madsen. In August 2003, Schultz changed his name back to Rasmussen, at the initiative of Hansa Rostock. He had never legally changed his last name, and Rostock wanted him to use the name on his birth certificate; Thomas Rasmussen.

In his first season at Rostock, Rasmussen played 28 of 34 league games and scored three goals, helping Rostock finish in ninth place. He was called up for the Danish national team once more, and played his second national team game in April 2004. In the 2004–05 Bundesliga season, Rasmussen played 31 league games and scored four goals, but Rostock finished in 17th place, and was relegated to the 2. Bundesliga. Having played two 2. Bundesliga games for Rostock, Rasmussen returned to Denmark in August 2005, to play for defending Danish Superliga champions Brøndby IF.

References

External links
 
 
 

1977 births
Living people
Sportspeople from Frederiksberg
Danish men's footballers
Association football defenders
Denmark international footballers
Denmark youth international footballers
Danish Superliga players
Belgian Pro League players
Bundesliga players
2. Bundesliga players
Sint-Truidense V.V. players
IF Skjold Birkerød players
BK Skjold players
FC Nordsjælland players
FC Hansa Rostock players
Brøndby IF players
Lyngby Boldklub players
Danish expatriate men's footballers
Danish expatriate sportspeople in Belgium
Expatriate footballers in Belgium
Danish expatriate sportspeople in Germany
Expatriate footballers in Germany